Cyrtulus kilburni is a species of sea snail, a marine gastropod mollusk in the family Fasciolariidae, the spindle snails, the tulip snails and their allies.

Description
The species' shells measure 35–95 millimeters in length.

Distribution
This marine species occurs off Durban, South Africa.

References

 Vermeij G.J. & Snyder M.A. (2018). Proposed genus-level classification of large species of Fusininae (Gastropoda, Fasciolariidae). Basteria. 82(4-6): 57-82.

External links
 Hadorn R. (1999) New discoveries from southeastern Africa. Two new Fusinus (Gastropoda: Fasciolariidae) from South Mozambique and Natal: Fusinus rogersi sp. nov. and Fusinus kiburni sp. nov. Vita Marina 46(3-4): 101-110

Endemic fauna of South Africa
kilburni
Gastropods described in 1999